The Critics' Choice Television Award for Best Actor in a Drama Series is one of the award categories presented annually by the Critics' Choice Television Awards (BTJA) to recognize the work done by television actors. It was introduced in 2011 when the event was first initiated. The winners are selected by a group of television critics that are part of the Broadcast Television Critics Association.

Winners and nominees

2010s

2020s

Multiple wins
3 wins
 Bob Odenkirk

2 wins
 Bryan Cranston

Multiple nominations
6 nominations
 Bob Odenkirk
 Matthew Rhys

5 nominations
 Sterling K. Brown
 Freddie Highmore

4 nominations
 Timothy Olyphant

3 nominations
 Bryan Cranston
 Billy Porter
 Liev Schreiber

2 nominations
 Mike Colter
 Hugh Dancy
 Paul Giamatti
 Jon Hamm
 Charlie Hunnam
 Damian Lewis
 Diego Luna
 Rami Malek
 Kevin Spacey
 Jeremy Strong
 Aden Young

See also
 TCA Award for Individual Achievement in Drama
 Golden Globe Award for Best Actor – Television Series Drama
 Primetime Emmy Award for Outstanding Lead Actor in a Drama Series
 Screen Actors Guild Award for Outstanding Performance by a Male Actor in a Drama Series

References

External links
 

Critics' Choice Television Awards
Television awards for Best Actor